"Livin' It Up" is a song by American rapper Ja Rule featuring singer Case, released in October 2001 through Def Jam Recordings and Irv Gotti's Murder Inc. Records, as the lead single from Ja Rule's third studio album, Pain Is Love (2001). The song, produced by Lil Rob and Irv Gotti, samples Stevie Wonder's 1982 song "Do I Do". In the United States, "Livin' It Up" peaked at number six on the Billboard Hot 100. It received a re-issue in the United Kingdom in 2002 and peaked at number five on the UK Singles Chart. Retired NBA All-Star Baron Davis and former pornographic actress Sunny Leone make appearances in the video.

Track listings

UK CD single (2001)
 "Livin' It Up" (LP version) – 4:20
 "Livin' It Up" (instrumental) – 4:20
 "Put It on Me" (remix featuring Vita and Lil' Mo) – 4:22
 "Livin' It Up" (video)

UK CD single (2002)
 "Livin' It Up" (album version) – 4:20
 "Livin' It Up" (live at the London Astoria) – 4:51
 "Always on Time" (Agent X mix featuring Ashanti) – 5:10
 "Livin' It Up" (video) – 4:30

French CD single
 "Livin' It Up" (radio edit) – 4:18
 "Livin' It Up" (video)

European maxi-CD and Australasian CD single
 "Livin' It Up" (radio edit) – 4:18
 "Livin' It Up" (instrumental) – 4:19
 "I Cry" (featuring Lil' Mo) – 5:18
 "Livin' It Up" (video)

Credits and personnel
Credits are taken from the Pain Is Love album booklet.

Studios
 Recorded at The Crackhouse (New York City)
 Mixed at Enterprise Studios (Burbank, California)
 Mastered at Bernie Grundman Mastering (Hollywood, California)

Personnel

 Ja Rule – writing (as Jeffrey Atkins)
 Robert Mays – writing
 Irv Gotti – writing (as Irving Lorenzo), production, mixing
 Stevie Wonder – writing ("Do I Do")
 Case – featured vocals
 7 – all instruments
 Lil' Rob – production
 Milwaukee Buck – recording
 Supa Engineer DURO – mixing
 Brian Gardner – mastering

Charts

Weekly charts

Year-end charts

Certifications

Release history

References

2001 songs
2001 singles
2002 singles
Def Jam Recordings singles
Ja Rule songs
Song recordings produced by Irv Gotti
Songs written by Irv Gotti
Songs written by Ja Rule
Songs written by Stevie Wonder